Charles-Joseph Zidler (1831–1897) was a French impresario. He co-founded the Paris cabaret Moulin Rouge with Joseph Oller.

Portrayals in films 
 Harold Kasket in Moulin Rouge, 1952 film directed by John Huston
 Jean Gabin in French Cancan, 1955 film directed by Jean Renoir
 The character Harold Zidler, played by Jim Broadbent in Baz Luhrmann's 2001 film Moulin Rouge!.
 Dominique Besnehard in the television film Mystère au Moulin-Rouge

References 

1831 births
1897 deaths
Impresarios
Moulin Rouge